Instrumentales con Al Hurricane is the fifth full-length album released by the New Mexico musician Al Hurricane on November 26, 1973.

Track listing

References

Al Hurricane albums
New Mexico music albums